La trovatella di Milano (i.e. "The foundling of Milan") is a 1956 Italian historical melodrama film produced and directed by Giorgio Capitani and starring Massimo Serato and Franca Marzi. Set during the Five Days of Milan, it is loosely based on a novel with the same name written by Carolina Invernizio. It grossed 146 million lire at the Italian box office.

Plot

Cast 

Massimo Serato as Gabriele
Franca Marzi as Corinna
Otello Toso as Count Patti
Luisella Boni as Maria 
 Rita Giannuzzi as  Count Patti's Nephew 
Luigi Tosi as Diego
 Franco Festucci as Ferruccio

References

External links

Italian historical drama films
Films directed by Giorgio Capitani
Films set in Milan
Films set in 1848
1950s historical drama films
Films based on Italian novels
Films scored by Giovanni Fusco
1956 drama films
1956 films
Melodrama films
1950s Italian films
1950s Italian-language films
Italian black-and-white films